was a Japanese meteorologist. Born in Tosu, Saga, he is best known for his discovery of the high-altitude air currents now known as the jet stream.

Jet stream and Esperanto
He wrote the first official report from Japan's Aerological Observatory (written in 1926 and in the auxiliary language of Esperanto). In this report (Raporto de Aerologia Observatorio de Tateno) data was stratified by season and used to produce the mean seasonal wind profiles. The profile for winter gave the first known evidence of the persistent strong westerlies over Japan that would later become known as the jet stream. In an attempt to reach an unresponsive foreign audience, Wasaburo Oishi published nineteen reports between 1926 and 1944, all of them written in Esperanto, in total 1246 pages. Wasaburo Ooishi was not only the director of Japan’s Tateno atmospheric observatory but also the head of the Japan Esperanto Society.

World War II 
Wasaburo's studies on the jet stream enabled Japan to attack North America during World War II with at least 9,000 incendiary bombs carried by stratospheric balloons and then dropped by a  timer mechanism on U.S. forests.
 Very few bombs in this bombing campaign, called Project Fu-Go, actually reached their targets. "Guided by Ooishi's wind charts, 9,000 Fire balloon bombs, called Fu-go, were unleashed by Japan between November 1944 and April 1945." Oishi's wind calculations were wrong, and instead of taking 65 hours to reach the US from Japan, it took 96 hours on average. As a result, most of the fire balloons fell harmlessly into the Pacific Ocean, instead of on the American mainland.

References 

Japanese meteorologists
Japanese Esperantists
1874 births
1950 deaths